The 2009 League of Ireland First Division season was the 25th season of the League of Ireland First Division. The First Division was contested by 12 teams and UCD won the title. Third placed Sporting Fingal also won the 2009 FAI Cup Final, qualified for the 2010–11 UEFA Europa League and were promoted to the Premier Division after winning a promotion/relegation play off.

Clubs

Overview
This season saw the division expanded from 10 to 12 clubs. This was because the 2009 Premier Division was reduced to 10 clubs. The regular season began on 6 March and concluded on 7 November. Each team played the other teams three times, totaling 33 games. UCD finished as champions and were automatically promoted to the Premier Division. There was no promotion/relegation play-off between the First Division and the A Championship this season. This was only because Kildare County, who finished bottom of the table, withdrew from the League of Ireland before the play-offs could be played.

Final table

Results

Matches 1 to 22

Matches 23 to 33

Promotion/relegation play-offs
The second and third placed First Division teams, Shelbourne and Sporting Fingal played off to decide who would play the winner of the Premier Division play-off. The winner of this play off would play in the 2010 Premier Division.  
First Division 

First Division v Premier Division  

Sporting Fingal won 4–2 on aggregate and were promoted to the Premier Division.

Top scorers

See also
 2009 League of Ireland Premier Division
 2009 League of Ireland Cup
 2009 A Championship

References

 
League of Ireland First Division seasons
2009 League of Ireland
2009 in Republic of Ireland association football leagues
Ireland
Ireland